Pezetaera is a genus of moths belonging to the family Tineidae. It contains only one species, Pezetaera hoplanthes, which is found on Java.

References

Tineidae
Monotypic moth genera
Moths of Indonesia
Tineidae genera
Taxa named by Edward Meyrick